Al-Kasaba Theatre and Cinematheque is a cinema in the city of Ramallah, West Bank, Palestine. It was established in 1970 during Israeli occupation for playwrights and eventually began presenting films. Al-Kasaba is the only official multipurpose cinema in the Palestinian territories.

History
Al-Kasaba was originally established in Jerusalem in 1970 as the Theatre Arts Group. In 1984, it was renamed Shawk Theatre. In 1989 it was renovated to host films. In 1998, the renovation of Al-Jameel Cinema in Ramallah, which closed-down in 1987, became Al Kasaba Theatre and Cinematheque. The cinema opened in 2000 and is one of the few venues in the region that allows Palestinian artists, actors and filmmakers to produce and present their productions.

Early 2002 the theatre hosted Nobel Literature Prize  laureates Wole Soyinka and Jose Saramago. A few weeks later, during the April 2002 invasion of Ramallah, the theatre was targeted by the Israeli army. The offices of the theatre were ransacked, and files and computers destroyed.

References

External links
 Al Kasaba Theatre & Cinematheque

See also
Palestinian National Theatre
Cinema Jenin

Theatres in the State of Palestine
Cinemas in the State of Palestine
Buildings and structures in Ramallah
1970 establishments in the Israeli Military Governorate